Pietro Gazzera (11 December 1879 – 30 June 1953) was an officer in the Italian Royal Army during World War II, as well as a prewar Italian politician.

Gazzera was born in Bene Vagienna, he joined the Italian Army and fought in the Italo-Turkish War and World War I. He was one of the signatories of the Armistice of Villa Giusti, which ended the war with Austria-Hungary on the Italian Front.

In 1928, starting as the Under-Secretary in the Ministry of War, Gazzera was the Minister of War from 1929 to 1933. From 1 August 1938 to 6 July 1941, Gazzera was the Governor of Galla-Sidamo in Italian East Africa.

General Gazzera commanded forces in the "Southern Sector" (the Galla and Sidamo area around Jimma) during the East African Campaign. Following the fall of Amba Alagi in May 1941, Gazzera succeeded Amedeo, Duke of Aosta as the acting Governor-General of Italian East Africa.  After Jimma fell on 21 June, Gazzera staged a mobile defense and held out in Galla-Sidamo for several weeks. His forces finally capitulated in July 1941 when he was cut off by the Free Belgian Forces of Major-General Auguste-Éduard Gilliaert.

Command history
 Commanding Officer, Brigade Basilicata – 1926
 Commandant of War School – 1926
 General Officer Commanding, Division Genova – 1926 to 1928
 Under-Secretary Ministry of War – 1928 to 1929
 Minister of War – 1929 to 1933
 Governor of Galla and Sidamo – 1938 to 1941
 Member of the Commission for the Affairs of Italian Africa, Senate – 1939 to 1940
 General Officer Commanding, 24th Colonial Division – 1940 to 1941
 Acting Governor-General, Italian East Africa – 1941
 Prisoner of war – 1941 to 1943
 Commissioner for Prisoners of War – 1943 to 1945

See also
 East African Campaign
 Italian Governors of Galla-Sidama

References

1879 births
1953 deaths
People from Bene Vagienna
National Fascist Party politicians
Italian Ministers of Defence
Members of the Senate of the Kingdom of Italy
Politicians of Piedmont
Mussolini Cabinet
Italian generals
People of former Italian colonies
Italian military personnel of the Italo-Turkish War
Italian military personnel of World War I
Italian military personnel of World War II
Italian prisoners of war